Angelo Morales is a Filipino international lawn bowler.

Bowls career
Morales won a fours bronze medal (with Christopher Dagpin, Leo Carreon and Ronald Lising) at the 2009 Asia Pacific Bowls Championships, held in Kuala Lumpur. 

Morales was selected as part of the five man team by the Philippines for the 2012 World Outdoor Bowls Championship, which was held in Adelaide, Australia. In 2014, he won the Hong Kong International Bowls Classic pairs title with Christopher Dagpin.

He won a gold medal in the pairs at the Lawn bowls at the 2019 Southeast Asian Games.

References

Living people
Filipino male lawn bowls players
Year of birth missing (living people)
Southeast Asian Games medalists in lawn bowls
Competitors at the 2005 Southeast Asian Games
Competitors at the 2007 Southeast Asian Games
Competitors at the 2019 Southeast Asian Games
Southeast Asian Games gold medalists for the Philippines
Southeast Asian Games bronze medalists for the Philippines